Old mission (or Old Mission) may refer to:

Organizations
Old Brewery Mission, a charitable organization in Quebec, Canada
Old Catholic Mission in France, a Christian denomination in France
Old Mission Beach Athletic Club RFC, a rugby team based in San Diego, California

Places
Old Mission House, a historic church in Fort Yukon, Alaska
Old Mission Dam, a dam near San Diego, California
Old Mission State Park, state park in northern Idaho

Michigan
Old Mission Inn, a historic structure north of Traverse City
Old Mission, Michigan, and unincorporated community
Old Mission Peninsula, a peninsula within Grand Traverse Bay of Lake Michigan
Old Mission Peninsula AVA, prominent region for the Michigan wine industry 
Old Mission Point, the cape of Old Mission Peninsula
Old Wing Mission, a historic structure in Holland

See also
Mission (disambiguation)